The Micropygidae form a family of sea urchins within the Diadematoida order of echinoderms. The family contains two living species of the genus Micropyga and one, Kierechinus, known only from fossils. Morphologically, they are quite flat and have short, sharp spines, which are close to each other. They occur in the Indian and Pacific Oceans.

Diadematoida
Echinoderm families